Paul Fritts is an American organ builder based in Tacoma, Washington, who, following historical models, has created over thirty mechanical action instruments that have contributed to the revival of historically informed organ music.  The Murdy organ at Basilica of the Sacred Heart (Notre Dame) in Notre Dame, Indiana is his largest Fritts instrument to date, with four manuals (keyboards) and 70 stops.  Other recent Fritts instruments of note are located at the University of Notre Dame (2 man. 34 st.), Princeton Theological Seminary (2 man. 39), and Pacific Lutheran University (3 man. 54 st.).  The organ at PLU was the largest Fritts organ built before the organ in Columbus.
 
Several of the most notable American performers have recorded on Fritts organs, among them William Porter, Craig Cramer, Christa Rakich, and Robert Bates.  In addition, the renowned German scholar and performer Harald Vogel has recorded on the Fritts organ at the Episcopal Church of the Ascension in Seattle (Op. 19). 

Fritts is part of a larger movement of organ builders who, in the wake of the Organ Reform Movement, have sought to apply historical organ building principles in crafting modern instruments.  This movement does not seek to copy historical instruments, but in some sense be "apprenticed to them." That is, Fritts builds Fritts organs, not Arp Schnitger organs, although the influence of the latter can scarcely be denied. Other builders in this movement include John Brombaugh, Richards, Fowkes & Co., Taylor & Boody, Charles Fisk, and Fritz Noack.

Bibliography 
 Whitney, Craig R. All the Stops:  The Glorious Pipe Organ and Its American Masters. (Public Affairs 2003).

External links
 Paul Fritts & Company Organ Builders 
 Making the New Basilica Organ (Youtube)
 Fritts, Paul. Historically-Informed Organbuilding in the United States. Vox Humana. March 25, 2018.
 Pipe shade carvings for Fritts Organs Opus 5, 11 to 25, 27 and 28 were designed and carved by Jude Fritts.
 Fritts organ at the University of Notre Dame in South Bend, Indiana, dedicated 2004, Opus 24
 Fritts organ at St. Joseph Cathedral in Columbus, Ohio, dedicated 2006, Opus 25
 The Gottfried and Mary Fuchs organ at Pacific Lutheran University in Tacoma, Washington, dedicated 1998, Opus 18
 The Marion Camp Oliver Organ at St. Mark's Cathedral in Seattle, Washington, dedicated September 14th, 2003, Opus 22
 Fritts organ at the Belle Skinner Recital Hall at Vassar College in Poughkeepsie, New York, dedicated 2002, Opus 23 
 Fritts organ at Grace Lutheran Church in Tacoma, Washington, dedicated 1992, Opus 13

American pipe organ builders
Musical instrument manufacturing companies of the United States
Living people
Year of birth missing (living people)